John Gill Jr. (June 9, 1850 – January 27, 1918) was a U.S. Representative from Maryland. He also served as a judge in Baltimore and on the Maryland House of Delegates and Maryland State Senate.

Early life
John Gill Jr. was born on June 9, 1850 in Baltimore, Maryland to Ann McKim (née Bowly) and George M. Gill. Gill attended Hampden-Sydney College of Virginia, and also graduated from the University of Maryland at Baltimore in 1870.  He studied law, was admitted to the bar in 1871, and commenced practice in Baltimore.

Career
Gill was a partner in the firm of Gill, Preston & Field with Baltimore Mayor James H. Preston.

Gill served as member of the Maryland House of Delegates from 1874 to 1877, and as examiner of titles in the Baltimore city legal department from 1879 to 1884.  He won election to the Maryland State Senate multiple times, and served from 1882 to 1886, and again in 1904 and 1905.  He also served as delegate to the Democratic National Conventions in 1884, 1888, and 1892, and was a member of the Baltimore Police Department Board of Commissioners from 1888 to 1897.

Gill was elected as a Democrat to the Fifty-ninth, Sixtieth, and Sixty-first Congresses (March 4, 1905 – March 3, 1911), but was not a candidate for reelection in 1910.  He served as judge of the appeal tax court of the city of Baltimore from 1912 to 1918, where he died.

Personal life
Gill married Nannie Kremelberg, daughter of J.D. Kremelberg. Her father was a member of the Austrian Consulate in Baltimore.

Death
Gill died in Baltimore on January 27, 1918. He was cremated.

References

1850 births
1918 deaths
Democratic Party members of the Maryland House of Delegates
Democratic Party Maryland state senators
Maryland state court judges
Politicians from Baltimore
University of Maryland, Baltimore alumni
Democratic Party members of the United States House of Representatives from Maryland
19th-century American politicians
19th-century American judges
Commissioners of the Baltimore Police Department